Isaac Viciosa (born 26 December 1969, in Cervatos de la Cueza) is a former middle distance runner from Spain.

Viciosa is a former European record holder at 3000m and the  first European man under 7:30. He won European Championships 1998 for 5000m, and was 2nd for 1500m at European Championships 1994. He was the winner of the Cross Internacional de Venta de Baños twice consecutively in 1997 and 1998, and he won the second Cross de Atapuerca race in his native Spain at the age of 35.

Achievements

Personal bests
800 metres - 1:46.90 min (1996)
1500 metres - 3:30.94 min (1998)
One mile - 3:52.72 min (1994)
3000 metres - 7:29.34 min (1998)
5000 metres - 13:09.63 min (1998)
10,000 metres - 28:26.75 min (2003)

References

External links

1969 births
Living people
Spanish male middle-distance runners
Spanish male long-distance runners
Athletes (track and field) at the 1996 Summer Olympics
Olympic athletes of Spain
Opus Dei members
European Athletics Championships medalists
World Athletics Championships athletes for Spain
20th-century Spanish people